is a Japanese television drama series which was broadcast by the 93rd Asadora (morning drama) six days a week on NHK between September 28, 2015 and April 2, 2016. It is based on the life of Asako Hirooka. It was followed by Toto Neechan on April 4.

A period drama, Asa ga Kita is set during the Bakumatsu and Meiji period, when Japan was undergoing rapid sociopolitical change.

Plot

Undaunted by Repeated Setbacks (weeks 1–13)

Asa is a naughty and curious daughter of a Kyoto merchant who wants to pursue studies in business, and is displeased with her father's arrangement for her marriage into the Shirooka merchant family in Osaka. However, her fiance Shinjirō gives her an abacus and encourages her to act on her own will, and her family agree to let her learn accounting.

Years later, Asa marries into the Shirooka family, and her in-laws allow her to study and work. Asa bravely stands up when the Shinsengumi force the family to lend them money, earning respect from them, her new family and its employees. Meanwhile, her older sister Hatsu has married into another family which strictly controls her.

In 1868, a financial crisis strikes. Asa helps her family survive by reassuring creditors and starting a new venture into coal mining. Hatsu's family goes bankrupt and are forced to hide from their creditors. With the help of Shinjirō, Asa finds them living in poverty; Hatsu has a boy after being abandoned by her husband. A samurai friend, Saisuke Godai (later Tomoatsu Godai), is able to find the husband and reunite the family.

Asa is pressured by her mother-in-law to have a child, and when Hatsu becomes pregnant again it is suggested that Shinjirō take a concubine. The couple struggles with the pressures and responsibilities before confessing their feelings and deciding to be faithful to each other.

Hatsu and her family leave to become tangerine farmers, on a plot of land in Wakayama provided by her father. Asa travels to the coal mine in Kyushu to attend to the business and discovers that she is pregnant. Shinjirō escorts her back to Osaka where she has a girl, Chiyo. There is sabotage at the coal mine by a worker who had been Shinjirō's childhood friend, seeking revenge for his family falling into poverty after Shinjirō's family refused to support them. Shinjirō withdraws further from the Shirooka business, giving power to Asa.

In 1878, Godai invites Asa to Tokyo to witness its advanced development; her parents and younger brother return from overseas. Godai introduces Asa to notable figures, including his friend Ōkubo Toshimichi. Later, after Ōkubo is assassinated, Asa comforts Godai who swears to finish his friend's dreams.

The Soft Heart (weeks 14–26) 

The servant Fuyu confesses her love for Shinjirō and willingness to be his concubine (as had previously been discussed) but is rejected. The man her father intended her to marry sees them together, and declines the arrangement. Kisuke, a Shirooka business manager who has loved Fuyu for a long time, proposes to her. Fuyu is touched and accepts, and the couple later go to the coal mine to monitor the workers for Asa.

Shinjirō's younger brother Eizaburō marries Sachi. Asa wants to reorganize the family business as a bank, which frustrates Eizaburō and head manager Gansuke as Asa gains control of the business.

Inn hostess Miwa provides a place for business people to socialise, and starts to serve foreign food. Shinjirō begins managing social affairs for Osaka business people, finding an important role to support Asa in the family business. At this time, Chiyo becomes discontented with her workaholic mother. In 1885, Godai dies in poor health, exhausted due to his devotion to the development of Japan.

Hatsu's first son, Ainosuke, begs to work in the Shirooka family business, and he is welcomed as part of the family. By 1891, the family's comprehensive shop for goods transactions and their investments in the textile industry have gained profit. Eizaburō has a daughter and moves his family to a separate residence. Chiyo becomes more displeased with her busy mother and fonder of her gentle aunt Hatsu.

Later, Asa decides to hire female staff for the bank, to give young girls a chance to work. Izumi Narusawa seeks Asa's help to create a women's university, and Asa begins to drum up support from notable people.

(to be added)

Characters

Cast
Shirooka family
Haru as Asa
Rio Suzuki as childhood Asa
Hiroshi Tamaki as Shinjirō, Asa's husband
Masaomi Kondō as Shōkichi, Shinjirō's father
Jun Fubuki as Yono, Shinjirō's mother
Fuka Koshiba as Chiyo, Asa's daughter
Rio Suzuki as childhood Chiyo
Yoshikazu Kiuchi as Shōtarō, Shinjirō's older brother
Akito Kiriyama as Eizaburō, Shinjirō's younger brother
Miyu Yagyū as Sachi, Eizaburō's wife
Asuka Kudō as Keisuke, Chiyo's husband

Shirooka family's employees
Takaya Yamauchi as Gansuke
Hiroki Miyake as Kisuke
Tomochika as Ume, Asa's dowry maid
Kaya Kiyohara as Fuyu, Hatsu's dowry maid and her daughter Natsu
Shigeo Tsujimoto as Heijūrō Yamazaki, the elite employee of the company

Mayuyama family
Aoi Miyazaki as Hatsu, Asa's older sister
Manase Moridono as young Hatsu
Tasuku Emoto as Sōbei, Hatsu's husband
Takurō Tatsumi as Eitatsu, Sōbei's father
Hisako Manda as Kiku, Sōbei's mother
Daichi Morishita as Ainosuke, Hatsu's elder son
Daigo Nishihata as Yōnosuke, Hatsu's younger son
Reemi Terashimo as Setsu, Yōnosuke's wife

Imai family
Shinobu Terajima as Rie, Asa's mother
Takeshi Masu as Tadaoki, Asa's father
Yoichi Hayashi as Tadamasa, Asa's paternal grandfather
Shōtarō Okitsu as Kyūtarō/Tadatsugu, Asa's younger brother
Tokiko Satō as Towa, Tadatsugu's wife
Coal miners
Ginnojō Yamazaki as Jirosaku
Yasuko Tomita as Kazu, Jirosaku's wife
Zen Kajiwara as Genkichi Miyabe, coal mine manager
Keishi Nagatsuka as Satoshi/Matsuzō, Shinjirō's childhood friend

Historical figures
Dean Fujioka as Tomoatsu Godai
Shuji Kashiwabara as Toshimichi Ōkubo, one of the three great nobles
Koji Yamamoto as Toshizō Hijikata, deputy leader of the Shinsengumi
Tetsuya Takeda as Yukichi Fukuzawa, the founder of Keio University
Yūji Miyake as Eiichi Shibusawa, the "father of Japanese capitalism"
Hideki Takahashi as Shigenobu Ōkuma, the founder of Waseda University
Keiko Matsuzaka as Ayako Ōkuma, Shigenobu's wife
Yuko Oshima as Raicho Hiratsuka, feminist

Others
Shōfukutei Tsurube II as Tomonobu Tamari
Yoshino Kimura as Soe Kushida
Kōji Seto as Izumi Narusawa
Sumika Nono as Miwa, Shinjirō's shamisen teacher and inn keeper
Shōzō Uesugi as Hikosaburo Hino, Fuyu's father
Riho Yoshioka as Nobu Tamura, Chiyo's school friend
Yumiko Takahashi as Funa Tamura, Nobu's mother
LaSalle Ishii as Yozaemon Yorozuya
Ikkei Watanabe as Dr. Kensaku Ōtsuka
Seiji Miyane as Nobuo Furuta
Sadatomo Matsudaira as Iwao Tominaga
Tomomitsu Yamaguchi as Kazutomi Ishikawa

Family Tree

Note: Those who don't have a surname displayed in tree means he/she change his/her surname upon marrying someone. Characters without name were mentioned but did not appear in the drama.

Role Models

Reception
Asa ga Kita was a ratings success, averaging 23.5% over the length of the series, the highest rating for an Asadora since the year 2000.

Spin-off drama Warenabe ni Tojibuta
The main character is Kisuke. It was broadcast starting April 23, 2016.

Cast
Hiroki Miyake as Kisuke
Rie Tomosaka as Satsuki
Takaya Yamauchi as Gansuke
Tomochika as Ume
Akito Kiriyama as Eizaburō
Sumika Nono as Miwa
Kaya Kiyohara as Fuyu
Shōzō Uesugi as Hikosaburo Hino
Jun Fubuki as Yono
Hiroshi Tamaki as Shinjirō
Haru as Asa

Awards

International broadcast

References

External links
 

2015 Japanese television series debuts
Asadora
2016 Japanese television series endings